Platynota meridionalis is a species of moth of the family Tortricidae. It is found in Argentina.

The larvae have been reared from Gossypium species, but are suspected to be polyphagous.

References

Moths described in 2013
Platynota (moth)